Something New Under the Sun is a 2021 novel by American writer Alexandra Kleeman. The novel takes place in the near future in which California has been rendered nearly uninhabitable by climate change.

Composition and writing
Kleeman wanted to include climate change in her novel in a way that was portrayed it as "[...feeling] more present and bodily". She set the novel in California, inspired by her childhood in the southern portion of the state. Kleeman deliberately wrote the opening of the book as a "realist novel" and made the story more "speculative" as it continued.

References

2021 American novels
Novels set in California
Climate change novels
Hogarth Press books